Bykovo may refer to:
Bykovo (inhabited locality), name of several inhabited localities in Russia
Bykovo Airport, a regional airport in Moscow